Club Deportivo Lagun Onak is a Spanish football team based in Azpeitia, in the autonomous community of Basque Country. Founded in 1944 it plays in Tercera División RFEF – Group 4, holding home games at Estadio Garmendipe, which has a capacity of 1,500 spectators. The team's name in Basque means good friends. Their closest rivals are Anaitasuna from Azkoitia.

Season to season

34 seasons in Tercera División
1 season in Tercera División RFEF

Famous players
 Gorka Luariz
 Unai Alba
 Mikel Aranburu
 Mikel Labaka
 Juan Antonio Larrañaga

References

External links
Official website 
Futbolme team profile 

Football clubs in the Basque Country (autonomous community)
Association football clubs established in 1944
1944 establishments in Spain
Sport in Gipuzkoa